The University Nanosat Program is a satellite design and fabrication competition for universities. It is jointly administered by the Air Force Office of Scientific Research (AFOSR), the Air Force Research Laboratory (AFRL), the American Institute of Aeronautics and Astronautics (AIAA), the Space Development and Test Wing and the AFRL Space Vehicles Directorate's Spacecraft Technology division. NASA's Goddard Space Flight Center was involved from the program inception through Nanosat-3.

The UNP is a recurring competition that involves two phases. The first phase (Phase A) occurs as university teams initially respond to a solicitation posted by the UNP program or one of its partner organizations. The solicitation results in a competition for selection for that program cycle. Typically 10-11 awards are made during this initial phase. Grants are offerred to the awardees to participate in a rigorous two-year process to design and develop their satellite concept. At the end of the two years, a Flight Competition Review is held where judges evaluate each program's progress and readiness to move to the next phase. Winners from each cycle are offered launch by AFRL when the systems are ready for flight. Other U.S. Government agencies, such as NASA through the Educational Launch of Nanosatellites (ELaNa) initiative, also step in to offer launch opportunities when available. Since 1999, there have been 11 cycles of the program.

The program's objective is to train tomorrow's space professionals by providing a rigorous two year concept to flight-ready spacecraft competition for U. S. higher education institutions and to enable small satellite research and development (R&D), integration and flight test. Approximately 5,000 college students and 40 institutions of higher learning have been involved in this unique experience since its inception in 1999.

Program Cycles

Nanosat-1/Nanosat-2
 1st-group. Arizona State University: Sparkie (3CornerSat) 
 1st-group. New Mexico State University: Petey (3CornerSat)
 1st-group. University of Colorado at Boulder: Ralphie (3CornerSat)
Boston University: Constellation Pathfinder
Carnegie Mellon University: Solar Blade Nanosat
Santa Clara University: Emerald and Orion
Stanford University: Emerald and Orion
Utah State University: USUSat
Virginia Polytechnic Institute and State University: HokieSat
University of Washington: DAWGSTAR

Events and Milestones:
 December 2004. Sparkie and Ralphie launch on the inaugural Delta-IV Heavy

Nanosat-3
The Nanosat-3 cycle started in 2003 when 13 universities were chosen to compete. The panel selected the
University of Texas at Austin’s Formation Autonomous Spacecraft with Thruster, Relative-Navigation, Attitude and Crosslink or FASTRAC satellite(s) as the winner.

 1st. The University of Texas at Austin: FASTRAC
 2nd. Taylor University: TEST
 3rd. Michigan Technological University: HuskySat
 Arizona State University
 University of Colorado at Boulder: DINO
 University of Hawaii at Manoa: Twin Stars

 University of Michigan: FENIX
 Montana State University: MAIA
 New Mexico State University: NMSUSat
 Penn State University: LionSat
 Utah State University: USUSat II
 Washington University in St. Louis: Akoya and Bandit
 Worcester Polytechnic Institute: PANSAT

Events and Milestones:
 November 19, 2010. University of Texas FASTRAC spacecraft launches on a Minotaur IV

Nanosat-4
In March 2005, eleven universities were chosen from the submitted proposals to compete in the Nanosat-4 Phase B effort. CUSat was selected the winner of the cycle in March 2007.

 1st. Cornell University: CUSat
 2nd. Washington University in St. Louis: Akoya and Bandit
 3rd. University of Missouri-Rolla: UMR SAT
University of Central Florida: KNIGHTSAT
University of Cincinnati: BEARSat
University of Minnesota: MinneSAT

New Mexico State University: NMSUSat 2
Santa Clara University: ONYX
Texas A&M University: AggieSat1
University of Texas at Austin: ARTEMIS
Utah State University: TOROID

Events and Milestones:
 March 2007. Nanosat-4 Flight Competition Review where CUSat named winner
 September 29, 2013. Cornell University's CUSat launched successfully.

Nanosat-5 
The Nanosat-5 competition began in January 2007 with 11 universities being selected from 26 proposal submissions. The University of Colorado at Boulder’s Drag and Atmospheric Neutral Density Experiment or DANDE was selected to continue on toward launch.

 1st. University of Colorado at Boulder: DANDE
 2nd. Washington University in St. Louis: Akoya-B & Bandit-C
 3rd. Michigan Technological University: Oculus
 Boston University: BUSat
 University of Minnesota: Goldeneye
 Montana State University: SpaceBuoy

 Penn State University: NittanySat
 Santa Clara University: Obsidian
 Texas A&M University: AggieSat3
 The University of Texas at Austin: 2-STEP
 Utah State University: TOROID II

Events and Milestones:
 January 2009. Nanosat-5 Flight Competition Review where DANDE named winner
 September 29, 2013. DANDE launches on Falcon-9

Nanosat-6
The Nanosat-6 Program Flight Competition Review was sponsored by the American Institute of Aeronautics and Astronautics was held in Albuquerque, New Mexico. A panel of judges from the Air Force Research Laboratory, Space Test Program, Air Force Institute of Technology and industry selected the winners identified in the table below.

 1st. Michigan Technological University: Oculus-ASR
 2nd. Cornell University: Violet
 3rd. University of Hawaii at Manoa: Ho'oponopono
 University of Central Florida: KnightSat 2
 Georgia Institute of Technology: R3
 Massachusetts Institute of Technology: CASTOR

 University of Minnesota: TwinSat
 Missouri S&T: MR & MRS SAT
 Montana State University: SpaceBuoy
 Saint Louis University: COPPER
 Santa Clara University: IRIS

Events and Milestones:
 January 2009. Kickoff
 January 2011. Flight Competition Review
 June 25, 2019. Michigan Tech's Oculus-ASR satellite launches on Falcon-9 Heavy

Nanosat-7
Eleven schools were selected to pursue the Nanosat-7 opportunity:

 1st- Microsats. Georgia Institute of Technology: Prox-1
 2nd- Microsats. Missouri S&T
 1st- Cubesats. University of Texas at Austin
 2nd- Cubesats. University of Michigan
 Boston University: BUSat
 SUNY Buffalo

 University of Hawaii at Manoa
 University of Maryland
 Massachusetts Institute of Technology
 Montana State University
 St. Louis University: Argus

Nanosat-8
The Nanosat-8 cycle started in late 2012 with the selection of 10 competing schools. AFRL announced the winners of the Nanosat-8 cycle in February 2015. The first four winners included Missouri University of Science and Technology, the University of Colorado at Boulder, Georgia Institute of Technology, and Taylor University respectively. With a tie for fifth spot, Boston University and State University of New York at Buffalo teams will support deep-dive visits from judges to each program for a tie-breaker decision.

 1st. Missouri S&T: MR & MRS SAT
 2nd. University of Colorado Boulder: PolarCube
 3rd. Georgia Institute of Technology: RECONSO
 4th. Taylor University: ELEO-Sat
 5th (t). Boston University: ANDESITE
 5th (t). SUNY Buffalo: GLADOS

 University of California, Los Angeles: ELFIN
 Embry-Riddle Aeronautical University: ARAPAIMA
University of Florida: CHOMPTT
New Mexico State University: INCA

Nanosat-9 
The Nanosat-9 Flight Selection Review process resulted in selection of the University of Georgia MOCI payload as winner with the University of Colorado at Boulder's MAXWELL coming in second.

 1st. University of Georgia: MOCI
 2nd. University of Colorado Boulder: MAXWELL
University of Arizona
SUNY Buffalo
Massachusetts Institute of Technology

Michigan Technological University
University of Minnesota
Missouri S&T: APEX
United States Naval Academy
Western Michigan University

Nanosat-10 
In November 2021, three universities were notified of selection for flight when each program's satellite is ready for launch.
 1st. University of Minnesota: EXACT
 2nd. Texas A&M University: Aggiesat6
 3rd. Michigan Technological University: Auris
 St. Louis University: DORRE

Nanosat-11 
The Nanosat-11 competition was announced in August 2021. Participants were notified by AFRL of onward inclusion in the Nanosat-11 effort on November 23, 2021

 University of Alaska Fairbanks: CCP
 Auburn University: QUEST
 SUNY Buffalo: POLAR
 University of Colorado Boulder: RALPHIE
 University of Maryland: THEIA

 Purdue University: FLaC-Sat
 Rutgers University: SPICEsat
 Saint Louis University: DORRE
 University of Texas at Austin: SERPENT
 Western Michigan University: PEP-GS

See also
 United States Air Force Research Laboratory#Space Vehicles Directorate - AFRL - SV
 NASA Educational Launch of Nanosatellites (ELaNa)

External links

References

Spacecraft design
CubeSats
Nanosatellites
Air Force Research Laboratory projects